Michael Moore (born May 16, 1945 in Glen Este, Ohio) is an American jazz bassist.

Moore started on bass at age fifteen, at Withrow High School in Cincinnati, where he performed in ensembles and the Presentation Orchestra in George G. "Smittie" Smith's Withrow Minstrels. He played with his father in nightclubs in Cincinnati. He attended the Cincinnati College Conservatory, playing with Cal Collins and Woody Evans locally. He toured Africa and Europe with Woody Herman in 1966, and recorded with Dusko Goykovich while in Belgrade.

In the 1970s, he worked with Marian McPartland, Freddie Hubbard, Jim Hall, Jimmy Raney, Bill Evans, Benny Goodman, Jake Hanna, Warren Vache, Herb Ellis, Zoot Sims, Ruby Braff, George Barnes, Chet Baker, and Lee Konitz. In 1978, he auditioned and was hired by Bill Evans after longtime bassist Eddie Gómez had left the group and Evans was in transition with drummer Philly Joe Jones. Moore left after five months due to dissatisfaction with the group. Late in the decade he began working with Gene Bertoncini, with whom he would play into the 1990s. In the 1980s he worked with Sims again and with Kenny Barron and Michael Urbaniak.

Moore was a member of the Dave Brubeck Quartet from 2001 until Brubeck's death in 2012.

Discography

As leader
 Live at Carnegie Hall – 40th Anniversary Concert, Benny Goodman (1978)
 Two in Time (Chiaroscuro, 1989)
 Roger Kellaway meets Gene Bertoncini and Michael Moore (Chiaroscuro, 1992)
 Plays Gershwin (1995)
 Michael Moore / Bill Charlap (Concord Jazz, 1995)
 The Intimacy of the Bass (with Rufus Reid) (Double-Time, 1999)
 The History of Jazz, Vol. 1 (Arbors, 2000)
 The History of Jazz, Vol. 2 (Arbors, 2002)

As sideman
With Kenny Barron
1+1+1 (Blackhawk, 1984 [1986])
With The Ruby Braff-George Barnes Quartet
The Ruby Braff George Barnes Quartet (Chiaroscuro, 1974)
Live at the New School (Chiaroscuro, 1974)
Salutes Rodgers and Hart (Concord Jazz, 1975)
Plays Gershwin, (Concord Jazz, 1975)
To Fred Astaire With Love, (Concord Jazz, 1975)
With Bob Brookmeyer

 The Bob Brookmeyer Small Band (Gryphon, 1978)

With Dave Brubeck
London Flat, London Sharp
With Bill Evans
Getting Sentimental (rec. live at the Village Vanguard, 1978)
With Gil Evans
The Gil Evans Orchestra Plays the Music of Jimi Hendrix (RCA, 1974)
With Art Farmer and Jim Hall
Big Blues (CTI, 1978)
With Jesse Green
Sea Journey (Chiaroscuro, 1993)
With Lee Konitz
 In Concert (India Navigation, 1974 [1982]) with Chet Baker
The Lee Konitz Quintet (Chiaroscuro, 1977)
Tenorlee (Choice, 1978)
With Blue Mitchell
Many Shades of Blue (Mainstream, 1974)
With Jimmy Raney and Doug Raney
Stolen Moments (Steeplechase, 1979)
With Joe Temperley
Just Friends (Hep, 1978) with Jimmy Knepper
Live at the Floating Jazz Festival (Chiaroscuro, 2000 [2002]) with Kenny Davern 
With Warren Vaché
Horn of Plenty (Muse, 1994)
Talk to Me Baby (Muse, 1996)
With Phil Woods and Lew Tabackin
Phil Woods/Lew Tabackin (Omnisound, 1981)

References
[ Michael Moore] at Allmusic

American jazz double-bassists
Male double-bassists
People from Clermont County, Ohio
1945 births
Living people
Musicians from Appalachia
Jazz musicians from Ohio
21st-century double-bassists
21st-century American male musicians
American male jazz musicians
Dave Brubeck Quartet members
Double-Time Records artists
Chiaroscuro Records artists
Arbors Records artists
Concord Records artists